Haryshaw is a small village in North Lanarkshire, Scotland.

References

Villages in North Lanarkshire